Daniel "Erfan" Okechukwu Olerum (born 13 March 1983 in Lagos) is a Nigerian football striker playing for Shabab Al-Ordon Club in the Jordan Premier League.

Club career
He started playing in Nigeria, first with Enugu Rangers and then with Shooting Stars SC.

In August 2004, Olerum signed with Foolad F.C. After making only 11 appearances and scoring no goals for Foolad FC in the IPL 2005/06 season, he decided to go to F.C. Aboomoslem, another Premier League side where he would go on to enjoy great success. He has won the best IPL 2006/07 forward award after having scored 17 goals for Aboomoslem, But in the next two season with Aboomoslem he only 9 goals together and could perform as well as before. He moved to Teraktor Sazi in 2009 and again had couple of unsuccessful seasons with Traktor Sazi where he didn't even score one goal. Finally in the middle of the 2010–2011 season he moved to Gostaresh Foolad in Azadegan League.

On 23 July 2011, he joined Aboomoslem.

In 2013, he joined Serbian SuperLiga side FK Sloboda Užice.

On 22 July 2013, he joined Al-Wehdat for 70,000 dollars comprehensive provider contract and monthly salaries for one season.

Club career

Honours

Individual
Iran's Premier Football League:
Top Goalscorer (2006/07) 17 goals, Aboomoslem, shared with Mehdi Rajabzadeh
Football Iran News & Events
Striker of the year (2006/07)
Foreigner player of the year player (2006/07)

Club
Shabab Al-Ordon
Jordan FA Shield: 2016

Quotes
"All I needed was just a chance to show what I could do, and Iran provided me with that opportunity" – On his move to Iran

"You know the death of my best friend Sam Okoye affected my game a lot, but now I am happy to be in the news for the right reasons, it came against the biggest team in Iran and I am grateful for my teammates' efforts as well. The fact that the three goals came in the space of twenty minutes left everyone stunned."- Talking about his Hat-trick

References

بازیکنی که در ایران مسلمان شد

External links
BBC Sport Article : Olerum Happy to be in Iran
The Nigerian Who Became Iranian(IranSportsPress.com)
Olerum Interview with Vanguard
Olerum Statistics
Nigerian sets Iranian League record
Olerum fires on in Iran
VIDEO : Olerum's Hat trick
PersianFootball.com on olerum

1983 births
Living people
Sportspeople from Lagos
Nigerian footballers
University of Nigeria alumni
Association football forwards
Persian Gulf Pro League players
Azadegan League players
Rangers International F.C. players
Shooting Stars S.C. players
Tractor S.C. players
Foolad FC players
F.C. Aboomoslem players
Nigerian expatriate footballers
Nigerian expatriate sportspeople in Iran
Expatriate footballers in Iran
FK Sloboda Užice players
Serbian SuperLiga players
Expatriate footballers in Serbia
Nigerian expatriate sportspeople in Serbia
Al-Wehdat SC players
Expatriate footballers in Jordan